Shilpakala Padak is an award instituted by Bangladesh Shilpakala Academy (BSA) to recognize ten established artists for their contributions to the fields of Bangladeshi arts, theater, music, dance, instrumental music, folk music and film and others. The academy is the principal state-sponsored national cultural center of Bangladesh as a statutory organization under the Ministry of Cultural Affairs.  The award is presented annually by the President of Bangladesh at National Theatre Hall Auditorium of Shilpakala Academy. The award includes ৳100,000, a certificate and an uttorio.

Winners

References

Civil awards and decorations of Bangladesh
Bangladeshi media awards
Awards established in 2013